Ritchie Green (17 September 1925 – 19 March 1999) was an Australian rules footballer who played for Carlton and South Melbourne in the Victorian Football League (VFL). He went to Camperdown as coach in 1953.

References

External links

1925 births
Carlton Football Club players
Carlton Football Club Premiership players
Sydney Swans players
Australian rules footballers from Victoria (Australia)
Camperdown Football Club players
Camperdown Football Club coaches
1999 deaths
One-time VFL/AFL Premiership players